XHOU-FM is a radio station on 105.3 FM in Huajuapan de León, Oaxaca. It carries the La Mejor grupera format from MVS Radio.

History
XEOU-AM 1480 received its concession on July 1, 1969, and signed on August 3 of that year. It was owned by Manuel Humberto Siordia Mata and broadcast as a daytimer with 500 watts. In 1993, it was transferred to Radiodifusora XEOU, which remains in the Siordia Mata family.

XEOU moved to 1020 in the 1990s, increasing power to 5 kW and broadcasting at night for the first time, and to 105.3 FM in 2010.

References

Radio stations in Oaxaca